Gelsted is a small town and parish in northwestern Funen, Denmark. Gelsted is located roughly halfway between Ejby and Aarup, 28 kilometers west of Odense. The parish is located in Middelfart Municipality, and  a small portion is located in Assens Municipality, within the Region of Southern Denmark. 1 January 2022 the town had a population of 1,711 with 2,312 in the parish in total itself. It contains the Gelsted Church.

The annual BornHack camp has been organized near Gelsted since 2019.

People 
 Kirsten Thorup (born 1942 in Gelsted), a Danish author, several of her novels are set in the town.
 Helene Blum (born 1979 in Gelsted) a Danish singer and musician who specializes in folk music

References

External links
Official site

Cities and towns in the Region of Southern Denmark
Populated places in Funen
Middelfart Municipality